Mandres-les-Roses is a commune in the southeastern suburbs of Paris, France. The palaeographer and archivist Robert Marichal (1904–1999) was born in Mandres-les-Roses.

Geography

Climate

Mandres-les-Roses has a oceanic climate (Köppen climate classification Cfb).

Transport
Mandres-les-Roses is served by no station of the Paris Métro, RER, or suburban rail network. The closest station to Mandres-les-Roses is Boussy-Saint-Antoine station on Paris RER line D. This station is located in the neighboring commune of Boussy-Saint-Antoine,  from the town center of Mandres-les-Roses.

Population

See also
Communes of the Val-de-Marne department

Education
There are two schools in the commune, Ecole Maternelle la Ferme de Monsieur (preschool/nursery) and an elementary school building.

References

External links

Home 

Communes of Val-de-Marne